The 1982 Western Michigan Broncos football team was an American football team that represented Western Michigan University during the 1982 NCAA Division I-A football season. In their first season under head coach Jack Harbaugh, the Broncos compiled a 7–2–2 record and finished in second place in the Mid-American Conference (MAC).

The team's statistical leaders were Chris Conklin with 853 passing yards, Shawn Faulkner with 910 rushing yards, and Bob Phillips with 39 catches for 577 receiving yards. Linebacker Les Garrett, defensive tackle/middle guard Dave Knapp, and tackle Duane Wilson were the team captains. Defensive back Mark Kujacznski received the team's most outstanding player award.

On December 10, 1981, Jack Harbaugh was hired as Western's head football coach. Harbaugh was 42 years old at the time and had been defensive coordinator at Stanford since 1980. He had played college football at Bowling Green and served as an assistant football coach at Michigan from 1973 to 1979.

Schedule

References

Western Michigan
Western Michigan Broncos football seasons
Western Michigan Broncos football